Duncan Roy (born 8 July 1960) is an English film director and producer, script writer, art director and television personality.

Early life
Roy was born on 8 July 1960, in Whitstable, Kent, England to Frances Elizabeth Spark and Kuros Khazaei. From the age of 2 he was raised by his mother and stepfather, David W. Roy in Whitstable.

Career
Roy was a subject of Robin Soans's play, Life After Scandal in 2007. He has also been the subject of a BBC Radio 4 documentary. In 1985, Roy worked at the Richard Demarco Gallery in Edinburgh. While there he organized art tours for the gallery to Germany and Poland with Joseph Beuys and Tadeusz Kantor. It was at this time that he met Jay Jopling, one of the subjects of his autobiographical documentary Whitstable.

Roy's 2002 film AKA is based on his personal experience beginning in 1979 when he headed for Paris, leaving Roy behind and reinventing himself as Lord Anthony Rendlesham."As Anthony Rendlesham, I didn't have to clutter my head with all the stories of my family, the terrible times. I could be clean, simple, grand. I was everything I wanted to be."

Personal life
Starting 1 November 2009, Roy appeared on VH1's Sex Rehab with Dr. Drew, a reality television series about treating sexual addiction. In early 2012, The Independent reported that Roy battled with cancer and had a tumor removed.
On 19 October 2012 a class action suit was filed by Roy and five others as class representatives as and on behalf of immigrants in L.A. County Jail detained without opportunity to post bail. Roy was detained for 89 days. Roy's Los Angeles bail bondsman Morris Demayo, who worked on getting him bailed out, recalls “The minute he got arrested, it was one weird incident after another. The jailer basically said 'We have an ICE hold, so we can't accept the bond.' There was just a runaround." The suit was joined by the ACLU among other groups.

Awards
AKA
2002 L.A. Outfest
Won – Audience Award
2002 Miami Gay and Lesbian Film Festival
Won – Jury Award
2002 Seattle Lesbian & Gay Film Festival
Won – Jury Award
2002 Copenhagen Gay & Lesbian Film Festival
Won – Audience Award
2003 BAFTA Awards
Nominated – Carl Foreman Award for the Most Promising Newcomer
2002 British Independent Film Awards
Nominated – Douglas Hickox Award
2002 Emden International Film Festival
Nominated – Emden Film Award

Filmography
 The Picture of Dorian Gray (2006)
 Method (2004)
 AKA (2002)
 Clancy's Kitchen (1996)
 Jackson: My Life... Your Fault (1995)

References

External links
 Official site

English film directors
English LGBT people
1960 births
Living people
LGBT film directors
People from Whitstable
Alumni of Arts University Bournemouth
21st-century LGBT people